Pratima Aur Paayal is a 1977 Indian Hindi-language film starring Rita Bhaduri and Sachin Pilgaonkar.

Music
"Suna Hai Jeewan Mera Charo Taraf HaiAndhera" - Bappi Lahiri
"Meri Payal Ki Jhankar" - Lata Mangeshkar
"Kala Kala Ho Tum Sakar" - Manna Dey, Aarti Mukherjee
"Sapno Ki Nav Lekar Hawaao" - Jaspal Singh, Aarti Mukherjee
"Mai Priyatam Adha Ang" - Manna Dey, Aarti Mukherjee
"Mangni Ko Barso Hue" - Preeti Sagar, Bappi Lahiri
"Bina Putar Ke Kul Ka Deepak" - Pankaj Bakshi

References

External links

1977 films
Films scored by Bappi Lahiri
1970s Hindi-language films